Southwark St John Horsleydown was a small parish on the south bank of the River Thames in London, opposite the Tower of London. The name Horsleydown,  apparently derived from the "horse lie-down" next to the river, is no longer used.  The parish was created by splitting St Olave's parish in 1733.

In the metropolitan re-organisation of 1855 it was grouped into the St Olave District with St Olave's and St Thomas's sending a joint representative to the Metropolitan Board of Works and remained as such after the 1889 creation of the County of London.

The civil parish became part of the Metropolitan Borough of Bermondsey in 1900 when the St Olave District was abolished, and in 1904 Southwark St John Horsleydown  was absorbed into the Bermondsey parish. Since 1965 it has formed part of the London Borough of Southwark.

It had a population, recorded in the census, of:

Civil parish of St John Horsleydown 1801-1901

References

History of the London Borough of Southwark
Parishes united into districts (Metropolis)
Former civil parishes in London
Bills of mortality parishes